Torlak is a group of dialects of South Slavic (Balkan) languages. Torlak may also refer to:
Torlak (Belgrade), a neighborhood of Belgrade
FK Torlak, Serbian football club based in Belgrade
Emina Torlak, American computer scientist
Nera Torlak, Croatian beauty pageant contestant
Sedin Torlak, Bosnian footballer and football manager
Torlak Kemal (died 1419), leader in a revolt against the Ottoman Empire